is a Japanese manga artist best known for his work Squid Girl. He was formerly assistant/student of Jun Sadogawa.

Works

References

External links
  
 

Living people
Manga artists from Kanagawa Prefecture
1983 births